Detective Investigation Files is a 1995 Hong Kong crime investigation drama series produced by Poon Ka Tak for TVB and is the first installment in the Detective Investigation Files Series. The main characters were played by Michael Tao, Joey Leung, Kenix Kwok and Louisa So. This installment featured five different cases. In 2022, the drama was selected as one of ten classic TVB dramas being honoured for Youku and TVB's new programme.

Synopsis
Cops Yung (Michael Tao) and Yee (Leung Wing Chung) were good friends as well as partners. Their shrewdness and intelligence helped break many mysterious murder cases such as ‘Love Suicide’, ‘Chopped Corpse’, ‘Murderer Vs Victim’.

Yung and Yee shared their worries over love too. Yung's girlfriend Chi (Kwan Po Wai) jilted Yung to go after Yee when she learned about Yee's wealth. Yung, on the other hand, met the headstrong reporter Chit (Kenix Kwok) during an investigation and they fall for each other. However, Chit already had a boyfriend...

Cast

Main cast

Supporting casts

Case 1: Insurance murder case（Episode 1-3）

Case 2: Secret of an Angel（Episode 3-6）

Case 3: The Butterfly Murders case（Episode 6-10）

Case 4: Videotape extortion（Episode 12-14）

Case 5: True and false kidnapping (Episode 15-20)

See also
 Detective Investigation Files Series

References

External links
TVB official website

TVB dramas
1995 Hong Kong television series debuts
1995 Hong Kong television series endings
Cantonese-language television shows